The Samail Ophiolite (also spelled Semail Ophiolite) of the Hajar Mountains of Oman and the United Arab Emirates is a large slab of oceanic crust, made of volcanic rocks and ultramafic rocks from the Earth's upper mantle, that was overthrust onto continental crust as an ophiolite. It is located on the eastern corner of the Arabian Peninsula and covers an area of approximately 100,000 km2. Based on uranium-lead dating techniques, the Samail Ophiolite formed in the Late Cretaceous. It is primarily made of silicate rocks with (SiO2) content ranging from 45–77 wt%. The Samail Ophiolite is important because it is rich in copper and chromite ore bodies, and because it also provides valuable information about the ocean floor and the upper mantle on land. Geologists have studied the area, attempting to find the best model explaining the formation of the Samail Ophiolite.

Geologic formations
The Arabian continental margin formed in the early Paleozoic and possibly the late Proterozoic. After that the thrust sheets are from low to high structurally: the autochthonous units, and the allochthonous units. The allochthonous units, from low to high structurally, are the Sumeini group, the Hawasina complex, the Haybi complex, the Ophiolite, and the Batinah complex. From the Sumeini group to the Haybi Complex make up the continental slope with an age range from Middle Triassic to Late Cretaceous.  The ophiolite formed in the Late Cretaceous and consists of a basal metamorphic sole (150–200 m), peridotite tectonic (8–12 km), igneous peridotite and gabbro (0.5–6.5 km), sheeted dikes (1–1.5 km), and lavas (0.5–2.0 km).  The Batinah complex containing continental margin sediments came from beneath the ophiolite during late-stage extensional faulting and then slid into the ophiolite late in the emplacement history.

Tectonic models
There are three different models that may explain how the Samail Ophiolite could form and overthrust a continental margin:
The gravity sliding model: A 7 to 20 km thick ophiolitic terrane could slide onto a continental margin. This requires an elevated source region, which presents difficulties.
The suprasubduction model: The obduction of an arc-trench gap ophiolite due to the collision of a volcanic arc and a passive continental margin (Fig. 2). Figure 2-A, older than 101 to 95 Ma the mid-ocean ridge is spreading and the ocean lithosphere subducted under the continental lithosphere on the right while the other side is overriding the oceanic lithosphere on the left. Also, that is where the proto Semail Ophiolite and volcanism starts to form a volcanic arc. Figure 2-B, from 95 to 87 Ma the mid-ocean ridge is spreading and a volcanic arc has formed. Figure 2-C, from 87 to 76  Ma the mid-ocean ridge is spreading and the ocean lithosphere being pushed and over thrust the continental lithosphere by the help of the volcanic arc.
The obducting model: The oceanic lithosphere over thrust continental lithosphere (Fig. 3). Figure 3-A, older than 101 to 95 Ma the mid-ocean ridge is spreading and the oceanic lithosphere subducted under both continental lithosphere. The Samail Ophiolite initial place is marked on the right oceanic lithosphere. Figure 3-B, from 95 to 87 Ma the mid-ocean ridge stopped spreading and the intra-oceanic thrusting started. Where the left oceanic lithosphere subducted under the right oceanic lithosphere with the Samail Ophiolite, which are accreted at amphibolite facies conditions at the base of the Samail Ophiolite. Figure 3-C, from 87 to 76 Ma the Samail Ophiolite overthrusts the continental lithosphere and is emplaced onto the craton, which are accreted at greenschist-facies conditions at the base of the Samail Ophiolite. This model is more supported by geologists.

References

External links
 Samail Ophiolite Detachment and Emplacement:Mechanisms and Timing

Cretaceous System of Asia
Geology of Oman
Geology of Saudi Arabia
Geology of the United Arab Emirates
Ophiolites
Al Hajar Mountains